The Alliance for Change (AFC) is a political party in Guyana.

History
The party was established in 2005 by three MPs who left other parties;  Raphael Trotman of the People's National Congress, Khemraj Ramjattan of the People's Progressive Party and Sheila Holder of the Working People's Alliance. Trotman became the leader of the party.

In the 2006 elections, the party received 8.1% of the vote, winning six seats. Their vote share increased to 10.3% in the 2011 elections, which saw the party win seven seats.

Prior to the 2015 elections, the AFC formed a joint electoral list with the A Partnership for National Unity alliance. The combined list won 33 seats, allowing PNC/APNU leader David A. Granger to become President.

References

External links
Official website

Political parties established in 2005
Political parties in Guyana
2005 establishments in Guyana